The Departamento de Operações de Informações - Centro de Operações de Defesa Interna was the Brazilian intelligence and political repression agency during the military dictatorship (1964–1985). This period started on March 31, 1964, with the removal of the civilian government by military forces and ended in 1984. DOI-CODI was responsible for suppressing internal dissent against the regime. It acted as a political police, using torture and other counter-insurgency methods, with a focus on anti-communism. Several political activists, intellectuals, artists, college students and journalists were interrogated and at times tortured by the DOI-CODI throughout its existence.

The first DOI unit started in São Paulo as a private organization called "OBAN - Bandeirante Operation" ( – OBAN). OBAN was an illegal organization created using members of the federal police, civil state police, military state police and select members of the armed forces. It was financed by private and corporate entities.

Each state had a DOI unit subordinated to CODI, which had the role of centralizing the operations. The DOI units' composition mirrored that of the previous OBAN.

The largest DOI-CODI, that of São Paulo, had at its peak nearly 250 agents, occupying a large building on Tutóia street. The building gained the infamous nickname of "Tutóia Hilton" (after the Hanoi Hilton of Vietnam) due to the extensive torture which took place in its basement.

See also
 ABIN (Agência Brasileira de Inteligência) - Brazilian Intelligence Agency
 SNI (Serviço Nacional de Informações) - National Information Service
 DOPS (Departamento de Ordem Politica e Social) - Department of Social and Political Order
 Araguaia Guerrilla War
 1975 assassination of Vladimir Herzog

References
 Vala de Perus - Municipal inquest into DOI-CODI activities
 EMILIANO JOSÉ - Memories of a gray sea (XXI)
 Unicamp newspaper- article by Eustáquio Gomes

Anti-communism in Brazil
Brazilian intelligence agencies
Counterterrorism
Human rights abuses in Brazil
National security institutions
Political repression in Brazil